The Kessock Bridge carries the A9 trunk road across the Beauly Firth at Inverness, Scotland.

Description
The Kessock Bridge is a cable-stayed bridge across the Beauly Firth, an inlet of the Moray Firth, between the village of North Kessock and the city of Inverness in the Scottish Highlands.

Designed by German engineer  and built by Cleveland Bridge, it is similar to a bridge across the Rhine in Düsseldorf. The Beauly Firth is a navigable waterway and hence the bridge is raised high over sea level. The four bridge towers dominate the Inverness skyline, especially at night when they are lit.

The bridge carries the A9 trunk road north from Inverness to the Black Isle. It is the southernmost of the "Three Firths" crossings (Beauly, Cromarty and Dornoch) which has transformed road transport in the Highlands. It has proved a key factor in the growth of the city of Inverness.

To protect against any potential seismic activity of the Great Glen Fault, the bridge includes seismic buffers in its construction. These buffers are at the north abutment, nearly over the line of the fault, and they supplement longitudinal restraint at Pier 7, the south main pier.

On the south side of the bridge is the Caledonian Stadium, home of Inverness Caledonian Thistle.

History
Prior to August 1982, travellers north of Inverness had the choice of the Kessock Ferry or a 20 mile journey via Beauly. Cleveland Bridge were awarded the £17.5million contract in 1975. Construction on the bridge began in 1978, with completion and opening in 1982. It won the combined design and construction Saltire Society 1982 Civil Engineering Award in 1983.

Transport Scotland estimated in 2012 that 30,000 vehicles per day were using the bridge.

Since 2007, the 25th anniversary of its opening, the Kessock Bridge has featured on the obverse of the £100 note issued by the Bank of Scotland. The series of notes commemorates Scottish engineering achievements with illustrations of bridges in Scotland such as the Glenfinnan Viaduct and the Forth Bridge.

The bridge's northbound carriageway was resurfaced between February and June 2013, followed by the southbound carriageway between February and June 2014. Both programmes of work were performed by Stirling Lloyd Construction Limited using their "Eliminator" bridge deck waterproofing system in combination with Aeschlimann AG's  impermeable surfacing material. The new surface is guaranteed by the contractors for a period of 10 years, with a prediction that it will extend the life of the bridge by 10 to 20 years beyond that.

In 2019, the bridge was awarded a Category B listed status by Historic Environment Scotland.

See also
 Banknotes of Scotland (featured on design)

References

External links

 Scottish Roads Archive - The Kessock Bridge
 Bridges of Inverness: Kessock Bridge
 Eliminator-Datasheet

Bridges completed in 1982
Bridges in Highland (council area)
Cable-stayed bridges in Scotland
Road bridges in Scotland
Transport in Highland (council area)
1982 establishments in Scotland
Black Isle
Buildings and structures in Inverness
Category B listed buildings in Highland (council area)